Asekan (also Romanized as Āsekān and Āskān) is a village in Bala Taleqan Rural District, in the Central District of Taleqan County, Alborz Province, Iran. At the 2006 census, its population was 65, in 20 families.

References 

Populated places in Taleqan County